1230 Riceia, provisional designation , is a stony background asteroid from the central regions of the asteroid belt, approximately 6 kilometers in diameter. It was discovered on 9 October 1931, by German astronomer Karl Reinmuth at the Heidelberg-Königstuhl State Observatory. The asteroid was named after Hugh Rice, amateur astronomer of New York and director of the Museum of Natural Sciences.

Orbit and classification 

Riceia is a non-family asteroid from the main belt's background population. It orbits the Sun in the central asteroid belt at a distance of 2.1–3.0 AU once every 4 years and 1 month (1,507 days; semi-major axis of 2.57 AU). Its orbit has an eccentricity of 0.18 and an inclination of 11° with respect to the ecliptic.

The body's observation arc begins at Heidelberg on 17 October 1931, or eight days after its official discovery observation.

Physical characteristics 

Riceia has been characterized as a stony S-type asteroid by Pan-STARRS photometric survey.

Rotation period and pole 

In 2016, a rotational lightcurve of Riceia was modeled from photometric data from the Lowell Photometric Database. Lightcurve analysis gave a sidereal rotation period of 6.67317 hours as well as a spin axis of (37.0°, −63.0°) in ecliptic coordinates (λ, β).

Diameter and albedo 

According to the survey carried out by the NEOWISE mission of NASA's Wide-field Infrared Survey Explorer, Riceia measures 6.19 kilometers in diameter and its surface has a high albedo of 0.318. The Collaborative Asteroid Lightcurve Link assumes a standard albedo for stony asteroids of 0.20 and calculates a diameter of 7.46 kilometers based on an absolute magnitude of 13.0.

Naming 

This minor planet was named after American amateur astronomer Hugh Rice, director of the Museum of Natural Sciences (possibly AMNH). The naming was proposed by Irving Meyer and endorsed by German astronomer Gustav Stracke who mentioned on a postcard in February 1937, that his American college, Meyer, who himself did not discover any asteroids, requested the naming after the city of Rutherford, where a private observatory was located at the time.

The official naming citation was mentioned in The Names of the Minor Planets by Paul Herget in 1955.

References

External links 
 Asteroid Lightcurve Database (LCDB), query form (info )
 Dictionary of Minor Planet Names, Google books
 Asteroids and comets rotation curves, CdR – Observatoire de Genève, Raoul Behrend
 Discovery Circumstances: Numbered Minor Planets (1)-(5000) – Minor Planet Center
 
 

001230
Discoveries by Karl Wilhelm Reinmuth
Named minor planets
19311009